Comparison of host-based intrusion detection system components and systems.

Free and open-source software
As per the Unix philosophy a good HIDS is composed of multiple packages each focusing on a specific aspect.

Proprietary software

References

External links
 Debian security manual
 Arch security wiki
 CentOS security wiki
 Ubuntu security wiki

Intrusion detection systems